Chop shop is a slang phrase with various uses including an illegal location or business which disassembles stolen automobiles for the purpose of selling them as parts.

Chop shop may also refer to:
 Chop Shop (TV series), a Canadian docusoap TV series directed by Ziad Touma about a "rock 'n' roll" hairdressers
 Chop Shop (film), a 2007 American film
 Chop Shop (novel), a 2004 novel by American writer Tim Downs
 Chop Shop (musician), also known as Scott Konzelmann, a noise musician
 Chop Shop: London Garage, a sequel to the TV series Bangla Bangers
 Chop Shop Records, a California-based record label